The Devil's Birthday (Danish and Norwegian: Fandens fødselsdag) is a humorous term in Denmark and Norway referring to December 11 and June 11. A royal decree  by king Frederick III of Denmark issued 17 December  1656, ordered that loan repayments and payments of interests should take place on these dates.

The term has been documented in written Danish since 1888.

References 

Scandinavian folklore